Leslie Stephanie Ramírez Pérez (born 11 January 1996) is a professional footballer who plays as a forward for Liga MX Femenil club Guadalajara. Born and raised in the United States to a Mexican father and a Guatemalan mother, she has triple nationality and represents the Guatemala women's national team.

Early life
Ramírez was born in Los Angeles, California, United States and raised in Reseda, California. Her father was born in San Miguel de Allende, Guanajuato, Mexico and her late mother in Guatemala City, Guatemala. She has attended the El Camino Real Charter High School.

College career
Ramírez has attended the California State University, Northridge, the Los Angeles Pierce College and the California State University, Los Angeles in the United States.

Club career
Ramírez has played for Invictus Club Feminae in the United States and for ŽFK Mašinac Trace in Serbia.

On 26 February 2022, Ramírez was officially announced as a new player of Mexican nationalist club Guadalajara. Her signing was questioned by some media since she is cap-tied to Guatemala and therefore no longer eligible to reprensent Mexico, an apparent premise to be able to play for Guadalajara (it was a policy during the administration of the late Jorge Vergara). However, her hiring was defended by current club board which has claimed that, according to the current statutes, there is no restrictions concerning foreign national teams, with the only condition being that "only Mexicans by birth can play", including foreign-born people with a Mexican parent, which it's her case, so she is not going to be asked by them to retire from her international career with Guatemala.

International career
Ramírez made her senior debut for Guatemala on 16 February 2022, starting in a 9–0 home win over the United States Virgin Islands during the 2022 CONCACAF W Championship qualification.

References

External links
 
 
 
 

1999 births
Living people
People with acquired Guatemalan citizenship
Guatemalan women's footballers
Women's association football forwards
ŽFK Mašinac PZP Niš players
Guatemala women's international footballers
Guatemalan expatriate footballers
Guatemalan expatriates in Serbia
Expatriate women's footballers in Serbia
Guatemalan people of Mexican descent
Citizens of Mexico through descent
Mexican women's footballers
C.D. Guadalajara (women) footballers
Mexican expatriate women's footballers
Mexican expatriate sportspeople in Serbia
Mexican people of Guatemalan descent
Soccer players from Los Angeles
People from Reseda, Los Angeles
American women's soccer players
Cal State Northridge Matadors women's soccer players
Los Angeles Pierce College alumni
College women's soccer players in the United States
Cal State Los Angeles Golden Eagles athletes
American expatriate women's soccer players
American expatriate sportspeople in Serbia
American sportspeople of Mexican descent
American people of Guatemalan descent
American sportspeople of North American descent
Sportspeople of Guatemalan descent